Why I Wore Lipstick to My Mastectomy (known as Lipstick in some countries) is a 2006 television film that aired on Lifetime Television and starred Sarah Chalke. It is based on the memoir of the same name, written by Geralyn Lucas. The book and the TV movie depict Geralyn Lucas's fight with breast cancer.

Plot
Shortly after graduating from Columbia University's Graduate School of Journalism, Geralyn Lucas lands her dream job working for 20/20. Lucas is then diagnosed with breast cancer at the age of 27 and has a dilemma — whether to have a lumpectomy or the potentially safer mastectomy. After consulting several doctors (including her husband) and researching the operations she decides to undergo a mastectomy. Her subsequent chemotherapy treatment leads to tensions within her marriage but the couple stays together. She also has breast reconstruction. The final shot is of Geralyn cradling her child, something she feared she would be unable to do. Geralyn meets several "angels" in the story, people who have been in similar positions to her and are able to dispense good advice.

The title refers to her belief that only confident women wear red lipstick.

Cast
 Sarah Chalke as Geralyn Lucas
 Jay Harrington as Tyler Lucas
 Lally Cadeau as Geralyn's Mother
Harvey Atkins as Geralyn's Father
 Robin Brule as Wendy
 Mayko Nguyen as Donna
 Julie Kahner as Meredith
 Patti LaBelle as Moneisha
 Conrad Pla as Cuban Taxi Driver
 Geoffrey Pounsett as Dr. Bob Bradley
 Jordan Baker as Adam
 Andrew Gillies as Victor
 Yanna MacIntosh as Dr. Crone
 Janet Lo as Mammogram Nurse
 Elizabeth Saunders as Dr. Meadows
 John Bourgeois as Dr. Frank
 Ron Lea as Dr. Keel
 Laurie Elliott as Woman With New Breasts
 Marcia Diamond as Mrs. Jackson
 Dwight McFee as Newsstand Guy
 Nicky Guadagni as The Photographer
 Dax Ravina as Tattoo Artist
 Lisa Merchant as Chemo Nurse
 Kim Roberts as Operating Room Nurse

External links
Official Website
Lifetime Website
 

Lifetime (TV network) films
2006 television films
2006 films
Films directed by Peter Werner